A hook is a punch in boxing. It is performed by turning the core muscles and back, thereby swinging the arm, which is bent at an angle near or at 90 degrees, in a horizontal arc into the opponent. A hook is usually aimed at the jaw, but it can also be used for body shots, especially to the liver.

Technique and variations 
Hook punches can be thrown by either the lead hand or the rear hand, but the term used without a qualifier usually refers to a lead hook.

When throwing a hook, the puncher shifts his body weight to the lead foot, allowing him to pivot his lead foot and generate kinetic energy through the hip, torso, and shoulder, swinging his lead fist horizontally toward the opponent. Sometimes, depending on style and what feels comfortable to the individual, the lead foot is not pivoted. Pivoting increases the power of the punch, but leaves one lacking in options to follow up with, such as the right uppercut or right hook.

The hook is a powerful punch with knockout power.

Variations of the hook are the shovel hook or upper-hook; they are body punches that combine characteristics of both the hook and the uppercut.

Another variation on the hook is the check hook, which combines an ordinary hook with footwork that removes a boxer from the path of a lunging opponent.

Several boxers noted for their hooks are Joe Frazier, Bob Foster, Jack Dempsey, Henry Cooper, David Tua, Tommy Morrison, Rubén Olivares, Félix Trinidad, Andy Lee, Sam Hyde and Mike Tyson.

Gallery

See also
 Bolo punch
 Cross (boxing)
 Jab
 Uppercut

References

External links 
 

Boxing terminology
Kickboxing terminology
Punches (combat)